Songs for Communion is an album of  Praise & Worship by Hillsong Church designed to be used in communion.

Reception 

In June 2006 Tony Cummings of Cross Rhythms rated the album as 8 out of 10 and declared it composed "almost entirely of mid tempo and slow songs and with arrangements that are low key and reverential perfectly suited to music associated with the Lord's Supper". Also that month CCM Magazine rated it as 8 out of 10 and advised listeners to "relax and close your eyes, and let the waves of prayerful reverence wash your spirit clean".

Track listing

Credits

Band
Lead Vocals:
 Darlene Zschech ("The Only Name", "Saviour")
 Miriam Webster ("The Only Name", "I Will Love")
 Steve McPherson ("My Hope Is Jesus", "What The Lord Has Done In Me")
 Julie Cowdroy ("Nothing But The Blood")
 Annie Garratt ("Gift Of Love")
 Holly Watson ("With Christ", "Scarlet Hands")
 Marcus Temu ("Life")
 Paul Andrew ("Worthy Is The Lamb")
 Erica Crocker ("Oh The Blood")
 Katrina Tadman ("Redeeming King")
 Brooke Fraser ("How Can You Refuse Him Now?")

Backing Vocals: 
 Julie Bassett
 Steve McPherson
 Barry Southgate
 Katrina Tadman

Piano/Hammond/Rhodes Piano/Keyboards/Bass Guitar: 
 Peter King

Add. Piano and Keyboards: 
 Nic Manders
 Christine Kinsley

Guitars: 
 Nigel Hendroff
 Andrew Tennikoff
 Timon Klein
 Jeremy Barnes
 David Holmes
 Nic Manders

Drums: 
 Rolf Wam Fjell
 Mitch Farmer
 Dane Charles

Percussion: 
 Nic Manders
 Peter King

Violins: 
 Oliver McMullen

Vocal Arrangers & Producers: 
 Peter King
 Julie Bassett

Production Team

Executive Producer: Darlene Zschech

Producer: Peter King

Project Manager: Tim Whincop

Mixed @ The Grove Studios by Nic Manders, assisted by Josh Telford. ("Redeeming King" & "How Could I..." mixed by Peter King)

Recorded @ The Grove Studios, 11th Hour Studios, Hillsong Studios & Kingtone

Recording Engineers: Trevor Beck, James Rudder, Peter King & Nic Manders

Assistant Engineer: Josh Telford

Additional Post-Production: Peter King

Mastered @ 301 Studios (Sydney) by Steve Smart

Art Direction: Josh Bonett, Michelle Fragar & Dan Codyre

Design: Cameron Booth @ Vein Media

Photography: davidanderson.com.au and Natalie Beaton

References 

Hillsong Music albums
2006 albums